South Estonian is either a Finnic language or an Estonian dialect, spoken in south-eastern Estonia, encompassing the Tartu, Mulgi, Võro and Seto varieties. There is no academic consensus on its status as a dialect or language.  Diachronically speaking, North and South Estonian are separate branches of the Finnic languages.

Modern Standard Estonian has evolved on the basis of the dialects of Northern Estonia. However, from the 17th to the 19th centuries in Southern Estonia, literature was published in a standardized form of Southern Tartu and Northern Võro. That usage was called Tartu or literary South Estonian. The written standard was used in the schools, churches and courts of the Võro and Tartu linguistic area but not in the Seto and Mulgi areas.

After Estonia gained independence in 1918, the standardized Estonian language policies were implemented further throughout the country. The government officials during the era believed that the Estonian state needed to have one standard language for all of its citizens, which led to the exclusion of South Estonian in education. The ban on the instruction and the use of South Estonian dialects in schools continued during the Soviet occupation (1940–1990).

Since Estonia regained independence in 1991, the Estonian government has become more supportive of the protection and development of South Estonian. A modernized literary form founded on the Võro dialect of South Estonian has been sanctioned.

Varieties 

The present varieties of the South Estonian language area are Mulgi, Tartu, Võro and Seto. Võro and Seto have remained furthest from the standard written Estonian language and are most difficult for speakers of standard Estonian to understand.

Three enclave dialects of South Estonian have been attested. The Leivu and Lutsi enclaves in Latvia became extinct in the 20th century. The Kraasna enclave in Russia, still aware of their identity, have been assimilated linguistically by Russians.

Characteristics 
The distinction between South Estonian and North Estonian is starker than any other contrast between Estonian dialects, and is present at every level of the language.

Phonological differences include:

Morphological differences:

History 

The two different historical Estonian languages, North and South Estonian, are based on the ancestors of modern Estonians' migration into the territory of Estonia in at least two different waves, both groups speaking differing Finnic vernaculars.  Some of the most ancient isoglosses within the Finnic languages separate South Estonian from the entire rest of the family, including a development *čk → tsk, seen in for example *kačku → Standard Estonian katk "plague", Finnish katku "stink", but South Estonian katsk; and a development *kc → tś, seen in for example *ükci "one" → Standard Estonian üks, Finnish yksi, but South Estonian ütś.

The first South Estonian grammar was written by Johann Gutslaff in 1648 and a translation of the New Testament (Wastne Testament) was published in 1686. In 1806 the first Estonian newspaper Tarto-ma rahwa Näddali leht was published in Tartu literary South Estonian.

Comparison of old literary South Estonian (Tartu), modern literary South Estonian (Võro) and modern standard Estonian:

Lord's Prayer (Meie Esä) in old literary South Estonian (Tartu):

Lord's Prayer (Mi Esä) in modern literary South Estonian (Võro):

Lord's Prayer (Meie isa) in modern standard Estonian:

The South Estonian literary language declined after the 1880s as the northern literary language became the standard for Estonian. Under the influence of the European liberal-oriented nationalist movement it was felt that there should be a unified Estonian language. The beginning of the 20th century saw a period for the rapid development of the northern-based variety.

Present situation 

The South Estonian language began to undergo a revival in the late 1980s. Today, South Estonian is used in the works of some of Estonia's most well-known playwrights, poets, and authors. Most success has been achieved in promoting the Võro language and a new literary standard based on Võro. Mulgi and especially Tartu dialects, however, have very few speakers left. The 2011 census in Estonia counted 101,857 self-reported speakers of South Estonian: 87,048 speakers of Võro (including 12,549 Seto speakers), 9,698 Mulgi speakers, 4,109 Tartu language speakers and 1,002 other South Estonian speakers who didn't specify their regional language/dialect.

The 2021 census in Estonia counted 159,900 self-reported speakers of South Estonian: 125,780 speakers of Võro (including 26,220 Seto speakers), 14,380 Mulgi speakers and 19,740 Tartu language speakers.

Language sample of modern literary (Võro) South Estonian:

Article 1 of the Universal Declaration of Human Rights:

Kõik inemiseq sünnüseq vapos ja ütesugumaidsis uma avvo ja õiguisi poolõst. Näile om annõt mudsu ja süämetunnistus ja nä piät ütstõõsõga vele muudu läbi käümä.

All human beings are born free and equal in dignity and rights. They are endowed with reason and conscience and should act towards one another in a spirit of brotherhood.

See also 
 Võro language
 Seto dialect
 Finnic languages
 Centre for South Estonian Language and Cultural Studies
 Võro Institute

References

Bibliography 
 Eller, Kalle (1999): Võro-Seto language. Võro Instituut'. Võro.
 Iva, Sulev; Pajusalu, Karl (2004): The Võro Language: Historical Development and Present Situation. In: Language Policy and Sociolinguistics I: "Regional Languages in the New Europe" International Scientific Conference; Rēzeknes Augstskola, Latvija; 20–23 May 2004. Rezekne: Rezekne Augstskolas Izdevnieceba, 2004, 58 – 63.
 Kask, Arnold (1984): Eesti murded ja kirjakeel. Emäkeele seltsi toimetised 16.

External links 
 Uralic languages (Salminen 2003)
 Võro Institute

South Estonian language
Finnic languages